Statistics of Ekstraklasa for the 1938 season.

Overview
The championship was contested by 10 teams, and Ruch Chorzów won the title.

League table

Results

References
Poland - List of final tables (RSSSF)

Ekstraklasa seasons
1
Pol
Pol